KRHS may refer to:

 KRHS (FM), a radio station (90.1 FM) licensed to serve Overland, Missouri, United States
 Kenton Ridge High School, Springfield, Ohio, United States
 Kingswood Regional High School, Wolfeboro, New Hampshire, United States
 Kittatinny Regional High School, Newton, New Jersey, United States
 Theodore Roosevelt High School (Kent, Ohio), United States, often called "Kent Roosevelt High School"